"A Good Heart" is a song by Northern Irish singer Feargal Sharkey, released as the first single from his self-titled debut album. It was released in 1985 on Virgin Records.

Background
Written by then-Lone Justice frontwoman Maria McKee about her relationship with Tom Petty and the Heartbreakers keyboard player Benmont Tench and produced by the Eurythmics' David A. Stewart, this was former Undertones singer Feargal Sharkey's third solo single. The song was Sharkey's only number one single and stayed at the top of the UK Singles Chart for two weeks in November 1985. However, it fared less well in the US, peaking at No. 74 on the Billboard Hot 100.

Sharkey followed up the single with the Tench-written "You Little Thief". This song was allegedly about Tench's side of the relationship with McKee. However, Tench denies the song is about McKee.

Austin, Texas-based singer-songwriter/guitarist Kris McKay performed a version of the song, featured on the soundtrack for the 1989 Patrick Swayze movie Road House. In 2007, McKee released her own recording of the track on her album Late December.

Formats

Additional credits
 Cover design: Timothy Eames
 Cover photography: Nick Knight

Chart performance

Weekly charts

Year-end charts

Sales and certifications

References

1985 songs
1985 singles
1986 singles
Number-one singles in Australia
Dutch Top 40 number-one singles
Irish Singles Chart number-one singles
UK Singles Chart number-one singles
Feargal Sharkey songs
Songs written by Maria McKee
Song recordings produced by Dave Stewart (musician and producer)
Virgin Records singles